De La Soul Is Dead is the second studio album by American hip-hop group De La Soul, released on May 14, 1991. The album was produced by Prince Paul, whose work on 3 Feet High and Rising was highly praised by music critics. The album was one of the first to receive a five-mic rating in the Hip hop magazine The Source; and the album was also selected as one of The Source's 100 Best Rap Albums in 1998.  The album's cover refers to the death of the "Da.I.S.Y." (Da Inner Sound, Y'all) age, or a distancing from several cultures including hippies and mainstream hip-hop.

The song "Oodles of O's" was featured on the soundtrack of Tony Hawk's Pro Skater 4.

In 2020, Rolling Stone placed the album at number 228 on their 500 Greatest Albums of All Time list.

Overview 
The album features a series of separate, ongoing skits. The introduction to the album features Jeff, a teenage character (introduced in the B-sides to "Eye Know" and "Me Myself and I": "Brain Washed Follower," "The Mack Daddy on the Left," and the rare "Double Huey Skit"). In a parody of old children's book-and-record read-along sets, Jeff finds a cassette tape copy of a De La Soul album in the garbage. Bullies appear, beat up Jeff, and steal the tape. Ensuing skits feature these bullies harshly criticizing the songs on the album. Mista Lawnge of Black Sheep provides the voice of the lead antagonist called Hemorrhoid, while P.A. Pasemaster Mase voices the other bully who gets ridiculed and abused by Lawnge for his admiration of the album. Throughout the skits, the sound of the signal that lets the reader know that it's time to turn the page is heard. In the end, they throw the tape back in the trash, exclaiming, "De La Soul is dead." The album also introduces a fictional radio station called WRMS that plays nothing but De La Soul music.

In 2008 the album was re-released on vinyl without the CD version's bonus tracks.

Track listing
All tracks written by P. Huston, K. Mercer, D. Jolicoeur, V. Mason; additional writers credited below.

The LP and cassette versions of the album did not include all of the tracks found on the CD release. The LP omitted "My Brother's a Basehead", "Afro Connections at a Hi 5 (In the Eyes of the Hoodlum)", "Who Do U Worship?", "Kicked Out the House" and "Not Over till the Fat Lady Plays the Demo", while the cassette omitted "Johnny's Dead AKA Vincent Mason (Live From The BK Lounge)", "My Brother's a Basehead", "Who Do U Worship?" and "Kicked Out the House".

Charts

Weekly charts

Year-end charts

Certifications

References

1991 albums
De La Soul albums
Tommy Boy Records albums
Warner Records albums
Albums produced by Prince Paul (producer)